Hubert Clarence "Nick" Knilans,  (27 December 1917 – 1 June 2012) was an American bomber pilot who served with the Royal Canadian Air Force (RCAF) and Royal Air Force (RAF) during the Second World War.

Military career
Born in Delavan, Wisconsin, Knilans was conscripted by the United States Army in April 1941 but, wanting to fly, he absconded to Canada and joined the Royal Canadian Air Force (RCAF). He sailed across the Atlantic aboard the Queen Elizabeth and joined No. 619 Squadron RAF in June 1943. He transferred to the United States Army Air Forces (USAAF) as a first lieutenant, with corresponding pay rise (equivalent to an RAF group captain), but insisted on completing his tour with his crew and was seconded back to the Royal Air Force (RAF), remaining with No. 619 until January 1944. He and his crew then volunteered to join No. 617 Squadron RAF (the "Dambusters") and took part in various raids, including Operation Taxable, Operation Paravane, and the attacks on the German battleship Tirpitz.

Knilans was awarded the Distinguished Service Order on 17 January 1944, the Commonwealth Distinguished Flying Cross, the United States Distinguished Flying Cross and six Air Medals.

Later life
After the war, Knilans was a teacher for 25 years and worked as a Peace Corps volunteer in Nigeria for two years. He never married.

References

External links

1917 births
2012 deaths
Canadian military personnel of World War II
Companions of the Distinguished Service Order
Recipients of the Distinguished Flying Cross (United Kingdom)
Recipients of the Distinguished Flying Cross (United States)
Royal Canadian Air Force officers
Schoolteachers from Wisconsin
United States Army Air Forces bomber pilots of World War II